Fatou K. Sene (born 18 November 1989) is a Senegalese footballer who plays as a midfielder for AS Dakar Sacré Cœur and the Senegal women's national team.

International career
Sene capped for Senegal at senior level during the 2012 African Women's Championship.

References

1989 births
Living people
Women's association football midfielders
Senegalese women's footballers
Senegal women's international footballers